Abdalla Uba Adamu (born 25 April 1956) is a Nigerian academic, educator, publisher and media scholar. He taught media and science education courses in many Nigerian universities and around the world, including serving as a European Union Visiting Professor at University of Warsaw, Poland, in 2012, visiting professor, Rutgers University, New Jersey, and visiting professor, University of Florida in 2010. Adamu holds double professorships in Science Education and Media and Cultural Communication, both from Bayero University, Kano, in 1997 and 2012 respectively. Adamu was Fulbright African Senior Research Scholar in 1991, he is also the developer of ‘hooked’ Hausa language character font sets (ɓ Ɓ ɗ Ɗ ƙ Ƙ), which were not present at the advent of the Internet. He was the Vice-Chancellor of National Open University of Nigeria from 2016 to February 11, 2021. He is due to begin work as Sabbatical Visitor at Kaduna State University, Kaduna, on March 1, 2021.

Early life and education 
Adamu was born in Daneji, Kano city, Kano State, on 25 April 1956. He received his undergraduate B.Sc (Education) degree in Education, Biology and Physiology in 1979 at Ahmadu Bello University. He did his National Service at a high school in Umoarkrika, Imo State, before he proceeded to Chelsea College, University of London where he earned Master of Arts in science education in 1983  He earned his doctorate at the University of Sussex in 1988  under the sponsorship of the Commonwealth Scholarship Commission.

Career
Adamu began his academic career in 1980 when he was employed as Graduate Assistant in Bayero University. He rose through ranks to become professor of Science Education and Curriculum Studies in 1997. In 2004 he presented in his Professorial Inaugural Lecture, Sunset at Dawn, Darkness at Noon: Reconstructing the Mechanisms of Literacy in Indigenous Communities in which he explored the use of Arabic alphabet as Hausa language literary devices in Ajami writings. He proposed what he called ‘Ajamization of Knowledge’ as an alternative educational strategy for millions of Qur'anic school pupils to acquire contemporary education in a literary script they know, rather than Latin alphabet.

Adamu was Fulbright African Senior Research Scholar at the Center for Studies in Higher Education, University of California, Berkeley from 1991 to 1992. While there, he wrote a monograph, Reform and Adaptation in Nigerian University Curricula, published by Edwin Mellen Press, New York, in 1994, which explores the transfer of educational influence and structures from the United States to Nigeria, and the substitution of British educational system in Nigeria in the process.

Adamu has given commissioned lectures at Rutgers State University of New Jersey, New Brunswick (2015), University of Warsaw, Poland (2012), Institute of Mediterranean and Oriental Cultures, Polish Academy of Sciences, Warsaw, Poland (2012), University of Florida (2010), University of Basel, Switzerland (2009), Barnard College, Columbia University, New York (2007), School of African and Oriental Studies, University of London (2006), and Institute für Afrinkanishe, University of Cologne, Germany (2004).

Selected works
 Transglobal Media Flows and African Popular Culture: Revolution and Reaction in Muslim Hausa Popular Culture: Visually Ethnographic Productions, 2007. 
 Reform and Adaptation in Nigerian University Curricula, 1960-1992: Living on the Credit Line: New York, Edwin Mellen Press, 1993. 
 Passage to India: Media Parenting and Changing Popular Culture in Northern Nigeria: Kaduna, Informart Publishers, 2004.
 Chieftaincy and Security in Nigeria: Past, Present, and Future (ed): Lagos, Tellettes Consulting Company, 2007.

See also
 List of Nigerian film producers

References

Academic staff of Bayero University Kano
1956 births
Living people
Nigerian film producers
Ahmadu Bello University alumni
Alumni of the University of London
Alumni of the University of Sussex
Academic staff of the National Open University of Nigeria